Cañon City is a home rule municipality that is the county seat and the most populous municipality of Fremont County, Colorado, United States. The city population was 17,141 at the 2020 United States Census. Cañon City is the principal city of the Cañon City, CO Micropolitan Statistical Area and is a part of the Front Range Urban Corridor. Cañon City straddles the easterly flowing Arkansas River and is a popular tourist destination for sightseeing, whitewater rafting, and rock climbing. The city is known for its many public parks, fossil discoveries, Skyline Drive, The Royal Gorge railroad, the Royal Gorge, and extensive natural hiking paths. In 1994, the United States Board on Geographic Names approved adding the tilde to the official name of Cañon City, a change from Canon City as the official name in its decisions of 1906 and 1975. It is one of the few U.S. cities to have the Spanish Ñ in its name, others being La Cañada Flintridge, California; Española, New Mexico; Peñasco, New Mexico; and Peñitas, Texas.

History
Cañon City was laid out on January 17, 1858, during the Pike's Peak Gold Rush, but then the land was left idle. A new company "jumped the claim" to the town's site in late 1859, and it put up the first building in February 1860. This town was originally intended as a commercial center for mining in South Park and the upper Arkansas River.

1860s to 1900

In 1861, the town raised two companies of volunteers to serve with the Second Colorado Infantry during the American Civil War. This regiment fought in skirmishes in nearby New Mexico and as far east as the Indian Territory (Oklahoma) and Missouri before ending its organization in 1865.

He drilled five or six more wells nearby, and he refined kerosene and fuel oil from the petroleum. Cassaday sold the products in Denver.

A number of metal ore smelters were built in Cañon City following the discovery of gold at Cripple Creek in 1891.

Historical designations
The Cañon City Downtown Historic District is an historic district that was listed on the National Register of Historic Places in 1983.

Geography
It sits primarily on the north side of the Arkansas River, just east of where the river exits from Royal Gorge. It is bordered to the south by the unincorporated community of Lincoln Park.

At the 2020 United States Census, the city had a total area of  including  of water.

Climate
The city's nickname, "the Climate Capital of Colorado", derives from the combination of unique geography and  elevation protecting the city from harsh weather conditions. The average daily high temperature in January is  warmer in Cañon City than in Grand Junction, even though the elevation of Cañon City is higher.

Cañon City has a semi-arid climate (Köppen climate classification BSk).

Neighborhoods

As Cañon City has grown, the city has both annexed surrounding communities and developed new subdivisions to create the city that exists today.

Dawson Ranch
Eagle Heights
Fireman's Bluff
Four Mile Ranch
Gold Cañon
Meadowbrook
Orchard Park
South Cañon, a historic neighborhood located on the west side south of the Arkansas River
Sunrise Mesa
Western Meadows
Wolf Park
Five Star Mobile Home park

Parks and recreation
Cañon City is home to many city-owned parks, as well as parks owned by the Cañon City Area Recreation and Park District.

City-owned parks
Centennial Park, commonly known as "Duck Park"
Denver & Rio Grande Western Park, commonly known as "Depot Park"
Greydene Park
Magdalene Park
Margaret Park (originally Margarette Park)
Mountain View Park, home of the city's skate park
Royal Gorge Park, home of the Royal Gorge Bridge and Park
Rudd Park
Temple Canyon Park
Veterans Park, known for Entertainment in the Park concerts during the summer

Cañon City Area Recreation and Park District
The Cañon City Area Recreation and Park District, commonly called the Rec District, was created in 1965 to better serve the community's recreational needs with parks, the R.C. Icabone Pool (a public swimming pool), a dog park, an archery range and a ropes course along with a rec district office with a community room.

The following parks are operated and owned by the Rec District:
John Griffin Park, located near the Sell's Avenue Trailhead of the Riverwalk
Harrison Park, the former playground of the former Harrison Elementary School which had been relocated to a newer, larger school building housing both elementary and middle school students
Pathfinder Regional Park, a joint-managed park located in the county between Cañon City and Florence
Rouse Park

In addition, the city maintains the Tunnel Drive Trail, a four-mile long out-and-back trail that follows the course of an old irrigation canal. The trailhead is located at the west end of Tunnel Drive, just inside the city limits.

The Guy U. Hardy Award for Service to Outdoor Recreation was created in the name of Guy U. Hardy to recognize people in the community who "help preserve, protect and advocate for providing outdoor recreation opportunities." Hardy had a significant impact on outdoor recreational opportunities in the Royal Gorge area.

Demographics

As of the 2020 census, there were 17,141 people residing in the city. The racial makeup of the city was 95.4% White, 1.0% African American, 0.6% Native American, 0.1% Asian, and 1.5% from two or more races. Hispanics or Latinos of any race were 10.2% of the population. There were 7,448 households, out of which 22.6% had children under the age of 18 living with them. The average household size was 2.05.

The age distribution was 22.6% under the age of 18 and 24.6% who were 65 years of age or older. Women represent 52% of the population.

The median income for a household in the city was $46,464. The per capita income for the city was $25,232. About 17.1% of the population were below the poverty line.

Law
Along with a police department, sheriff's office and detention center, and a municipal court, Cañon City is home to the courts for Fremont County and the 11th Judicial District of Colorado. It has been described as "America’s cheeriest prison town".

Government
Cañon City is governed via the Council–manager government system. The city council consists of seven members who are elected from districts. The mayor is elected by the entire city.

Economy
The area being situated along the Arkansas River has allowed for soil suitable to orchards, ranching, and farming, but has largely grown to rely on the large number of state and federal prisons in the area, as well as to tourism, education, manufacturing, medicine and many other sectors.

Major employers
Cañon City depends on the Colorado Department of Corrections and federal prison system, and its tourism industry which includes the Royal Gorge Route Railroad, Royal Gorge Bridge and Park, Red Canyon Park, The Abbey winery, and various other attractions. The major local employers include downtown shops, the entrepreneurial TechSTART initiative that attracts major technology-based entrepreneurs, and Centura Health (owner of St. Thomas More Hospital and the Progressive Care Center).

Prisons
Prisons have served an important significance to both Cañon City and the surrounding areas of Fremont County, as well as to the state of Colorado. The Museum of Colorado Prisons has been given the role of preserving and presenting the past of the state's corrections system. Colorado Department of Corrections operates the Colorado Territorial Correctional Facility in Cañon City. In addition to several correctional facilities near Cañon City in unincorporated areas in Fremont County, Colorado State Penitentiary, the location of the state death row and execution chamber is in Fremont County. Other state prisons in Fremont County include Arrowhead Correctional Center, Centennial Correctional Facility, Fremont Correctional Facility, Four Mile Correctional Center, and Skyline Correctional Center.

On October 3, 1929, a riot at the prison claimed 13 lives.

The Colorado Women's Correctional Facility near Cañon City in unincorporated Fremont County was decommissioned on June 4, 2009.

Tourism
From Cañon City's Downtown Historic District located in the heart of the city to the Royal Gorge Bridge, there are many places to see and visit in the area.

Media
Cañon City is home to a daily newspaper, called the Cañon City Daily Record; an FM radio station, Star Country 104.5 FM; and a long-running AM radio station, known as KRLN NewsRadio 1400 AM.

Transportation
Transportation in the Cañon City area consists of cab service, shuttle bus service, and a downtown wagon ride. The Royal Gorge Bridge trolley had also been used during special events (it was destroyed in the Royal Gorge Fire, but it was reserved for use by the Royal Gorge Bridge & Park. Jeep tours and Segway tours are also available to explore local parks such as Red Canyon Park or scenic places such as Skyline Drive.

The town is served by the Fremont County airport (1V6) which is 6 miles to the East and currently has no scheduled passenger service. Within an hour's drive is the Colorado Springs airport with daily service by major airlines.

Major roads and highways
The area is served by one state and one U.S. highway with a mix of city and county roads to navigate the city or connect to neighboring areas.

State and national highways
U.S. Highway 50 - named Royal Gorge Boulevard from 1st Street to 15th Street in downtown Cañon
State Highway 115 - connects the city to nearby Florence and Penrose, ending in Colorado Springs

City and county roads
4th Street - connecting Downtown with South Cañon, Oak Creek Grade, Prospect Heights, and Capitol Hill
5th Street - serves as a north-south connector from Downtown north, allows traffic from Skyline Drive to return to U.S. 50
9th Street - serves as a carrier of CO 115 from the roundabout to the junction with U.S. 50, heads north and ends at Washington Street
15th Street - main route north to the hospital, a fire station and a small cluster of businesses
Orchard Avenue
Raynolds Avenue/Ash Street - runs from center of East Cañon to CO 115 via a county road, changes to a gravel road and becomes Chandler Road
MacKenzie / Four Mile Lane - routed to connect from CO 115 as a carrier of CR 20 until the city limits, at Hwy 50, heads north as Four Mile Lane

Bus service
Cañon City is part of Colorado's Bustang network. It is on the Alamosa-Pueblo Outrider line.

Scenic routes
Skyline Drive, major scenic route overlooking Cañon City that was originally built by local inmates at the Territorial Prison

Railroads
The Union Pacific Railroad mothballed the Tennessee Pass line in 1997. In 1998 Rock and Rail LLC was formed, and began operating on the former Union Pacific track between Cañon City and Parkdale. It also operates between Pueblo and Cañon City on lines purchased from the UP Railway. The tourist line Cañon City and Royal Gorge Railroad also operates on the RRRR's track.

Education
See also Cañon City School District
Cañon City's school system is under the direction of the Cañon City School District Fremont RE-1. The district currently has four elementary schools, one charter school, one school serving as both an elementary school and middle school, one middle school and one high school, Cañon City High School. For the higher education needs of the community, Pueblo Community College provides a branch campus on the west end of the city along U.S. Highway 50.

Places of interest

Listed on the National Register of Historic Places
Cañon City Downtown Historic District
Cañon City Municipal Building, also known as the Royal Gorge Regional Museum and History Center
Cañon City Post Office and Federal Building
Cañon City State Armory

Other sites
Colorado State Penitentiary
Colorado Territorial Correctional Facility
Holy Cross Abbey (Cañon City, Colorado)
Museum of Colorado Prisons
Peabody Mansion, home of the Cañon City Chamber of Commerce
Royal Gorge Bridge and Park
Royal Gorge Route Railroad

Defunct sites
Buckskin Joe, closed in 2010

Notable people
Robert Wesley Amick, artist
Don Bendell, writer
Jack Christiansen, NFL hall-of-famer (Detroit Lions)
Donald S. Fredrickson, medical researcher, former director of the National Institutes of Health and first president of the Howard Hughes Medical Institute; born in Cañon City
Skip Konte, musician, "Wizard of all Northern Realms"
Vice Admiral Emory S. Land (U.S. Navy), born in Cañon City
Bird Millman, stage name of Jeannadean Engleman, Circus Aerialist, born in Cañon City
James Hamilton Peabody, former Colorado governor

In popular culture

The movie Canon City (1948) depicts the real-life 1947 escape of 12 prisoners from nearby Colorado State Penitentiary.

A diner in Cañon City is the setting of the song "Navajo Rug", which was named by the Western Writers of America as one of the Top 100 Western Songs of all time.

A fictional version of the city is depicted in Philip K. Dick's alternate history novel The Man in the High Castle (1963) and its eponymous 2015 television series adaptation. Cañon City is in an ostensibly-demilitarized "neutral zone" between the puppet regimes of the Japanese Pacific States, in the west, and Greater Nazi Reich, in the east, in the former United States.

The season 12 premiere of the television series ER features the characters Samantha Taggart and Luka Kovac going to Canon City to find her son, who had run away to find his father, who was in prison there.

In the Japanese manga series, JoJo's Bizarre Adventure, a turn-of-the-century race across the United States from San Diego to New York City takes place as the main story of the story's seventh part, Steel Ball Run. Cañon City (spelled Canon City) is featured as the third stage finish line and checkpoint for the racers.

Sister cities 

Cañon City's sister cities are:
 Chalchicomula de Sesma, Mexico
 Kahoku, Japan
 Valday, Russia

See also

Colorado
Bibliography of Colorado
Index of Colorado-related articles
Outline of Colorado
List of counties in Colorado
List of municipalities in Colorado
List of places in Colorado
List of statistical areas in Colorado
Front Range Urban Corridor
South Central Colorado Urban Area
Pueblo-Cañon City, CO Combined Statistical Area
Cañon City, CO Micropolitan Statistical Area
Colorado State Penitentiary
Royal Gorge
List of crossings of the Arkansas River
Royal Gorge Bridge

References

External links 

City of Cañon City official website
Cañon City news and information from the Cañon City Daily Record
CDOT map of the City of Cañon City
Cañon City & Royal Gorge Visitor Information
Cañon City Chamber of Commerce

 
Cities in Fremont County, Colorado
Cities in Colorado
County seats in Colorado
Colorado populated places on the Arkansas River
1860 establishments in Kansas Territory